What Are We Doing Here? may refer to:

"What Are We Doing Here?", a song on John Entwistle's 1971 album Smash Your Head Against the Wall
What Are We Doing Here? (film) (Qu'est-ce qu'on fait ici?), a 2014 film directed by Julie Hivon

See also
 What Are We Doing? (disambiguation)